General Velásquez is a Chilean football club, their home town is San Vicente de Tagua Tagua, Chile. They currently play in the third level of Chilean football, the Segunda Division.

The club was founded on January 8, 1908 as General Velásquez in honor of José Velásquez Bórquez, a general who participated in the War of the Pacific.

Squad
.

Honours

 Tercera División de Chile (2): 1986, 2017
 Campeonato Regional Zona Central (1): 1976

Seasons played
6 seasons in Primera B
22 seasons in Tercera División
2 seasons in Tercera División B

See also
Chilean football league system

External links
 Official Club site

Football clubs in Chile
Association football clubs established in 1908
1908 establishments in Chile